Charles Brewer (born October 15, 1969, in Philadelphia, Pennsylvania), is a retired professional boxer in the Super Middleweight (168lb) division. 

Known as "The Hatchet", Brewer was 14–3 as an amateur. He turned professional in 1989 and in 1997 won the Vacant IBF Super Middleweight Title with a TKO over Gary Ballard. He defended the title three times including a knockout win over Herol Graham, before losing the belt to Sven Ottke in a split decision. In a 2000 rematch, he lost another split decision to Ottke. 

In 2002, he fought WBO Super Middleweight Title holder and future hall of famer Joe Calzaghe in Cardiff but lost by a wide margin. His last shot at the title came in 2004 when he took on WBO Super Middleweight Interim Title holder Mario Veit but was TKO'd in the 9th round. Brewer last fought in April 2005.

Professional boxing record

See also 

 List of IBF world champions

External links 
 

1969 births
International Boxing Federation champions
Living people
American male boxers
Boxers from Philadelphia
Super-middleweight boxers